Horka u Staré Paky is a municipality and village in Semily District in the Liberec Region of the Czech Republic. It has about 200 inhabitants.

Administrative parts
The village of Nedaříž is an administrative part of Horka u Staré Paky.

References

Villages in Semily District